George Beer Endacott (28 February 1901 – September 1971) was a British-born Hong Kong historian.

He was born in South Devon in the West England as a son of railway worker. He was educated at Tavistock Grammar School and Exeter University and became a teacher. In the 1930s, he attended Balliol College, Oxford and read politics, philosophy and economics, returning to teaching until he entered the Royal Navy in 1942.

During the Second World War he served mainly in the Mediterranean as an interpreter with the French forces. On leaving the Navy in 1946 he took up an appointment as lecturer in history at the University of Hong Kong where he remained until his retirement in 1962. As a historian and author he wrote a number of books including A History of Hong Kong, Fragrant Harbour (with A Hinton) and Government and the People. The manuscript of his last book, Hong Kong Eclipse, was almost finished at the time of his death. It was completed, at the request of the Hong Kong government, by Alan Birch, a senior member of the History Department at the University of Hong Kong who Endacott had asked to read the manuscript.

Bibliography
 Endacott, George Beer and Dorothy E. She (1949). The Diocese of Victoria, Hong Kong. A Hundred Years of Church History, 1849–1949.
 
 
 
 
 
 Endacott, George Beer (1967). Fourth Impression.

References

Royal Navy officers
20th-century Hong Kong historians
Alumni of Balliol College, Oxford
Alumni of the University of Exeter
Academic staff of the University of Hong Kong
1901 births
1971 deaths
Writers from Tavistock
Historians of Hong Kong
Schoolteachers from Devon
British people in British Hong Kong